Deh Kahan (also Romanized as Deh Kahān, Deh-e Kahān, Deh-e Kāhn, and Deh Kahn; also known as Deh Kahnū and Deh Kehnu) is a village in Deh Kahan Rural District, Aseminun District, Manujan County, Kerman Province, Iran. At the 2006 census, its population was 1,103, in 235 families.

References 

Populated places in Manujan County